Laramie is derived from a French surname LaRamie and often refers to  Laramie, Wyoming, or one of the places named after it.

Places
Laramie (CTA Blue Line station), a former station on the Chicago Transit Authority's 'L' system
Laramie (CTA station), a station on the Chicago Transit Authority's 'L' system
Laramie, Wyoming
Laramie County, Wyoming
Episcopal Diocese of Western Nebraska, known as the Missionary District of Laramie when it included portions of Wyoming
Laramie Mountains, a range of peaks in the Rocky Mountains in the states of Wyoming and Colorado in the United States
Laramie River
North Laramie River

People
Laramie Dean, American guitarist
Jacques La Ramee (alt. spelling Jacques LaRamie), French fur trapper, who was killed near the river bearing his name

Arts, entertainment, and media
Laramie (film), 1949 western starring Charles Starrett
Laramie (TV series), television series
The Laramie Project, 2000 play written and directed by Moisés Kaufman
The Laramie Project (film), 2002 film based on the play
The Man from Laramie, 1955 American western movie directed by Anthony Mann

Brands and enterprises
Laramie (cigarette), a brand of cigarette tube
Laramie, a version of the Dodge Ram pickup
Beretta Laramie, a revolver, replica of the Smith & Wesson Model 3

Ships
USNS Laramie (T-AO-203), a United States Navy fleet replenishment oiler in service with the Military Sealift Command since 1996
USS Laramie (AO-16), a fleet replenishment oiler in commission in the United States Navy from 1921 to 1922 and from 1940 to 1945

See also
Fort Laramie (disambiguation)